The 2008 USASA National Women's Open was the 13th edition of the annual national soccer championship, with FC Indiana winning their second title, (their first being 2005,) making up for their loss in last year's final to Ajax America.

Regional Phase

National Finals

Games played at the Starfire Sports Complex in Tukwila, Washington.

References

2008
Open
United